The Biała Podlaska Voivodeship was a voivodeship (province) of the Polish People's Republic from 1975 to 1989, and the Third Republic of Poland from 1989 to 1998. Its capital was Biała Podlaska. It was established on 1 June 1975, from the parts of the voivodeships of Lublin, and Warsaw Voivodeship, and existed until 31 December 1998, when it was partitioned between then-established Lublin, and Masovian Voivodeships.

History 
The Biała Voivodeship was established on 1 June 1975, as part of the administrative reform, and was one of the voivodeships (provinces) of the Polish People's Republic. It was formed mostly from the part of the territory of the Lublin Voivodeship, additionally including part of the territory of the Łosice County, of the Warsaw Voivodeship. Its capital was located in the city of Bielsko-Biała. In 1975, it had a population of 	280 400 people.

On 9 December 1989, the Polish People's Republic was replaced by the Third Republic of Poland. In 1997, the voivodeship had a population of 309 000 people, and had an area of 5 348 km². It existed until 31 December 1998, when it was partitioned between then-established Lublin, and Masovian Voivodeships.

Subdivisions 

In 1997, the voivodeship was divided into 40 gminas (municipalities), including four urban municipalities, two urban-rural municipalities, and 34 rural municipalities. It had six cities that functioned as separate municipalities.

From 1990 to 1998, it was additionally divided into three district offices, each comprising several municipalities.

Demographics

Leaders 
The leader of the administrative division was the voivode. The people in that office, between 1975, and 1998, were:
1975–1986: Józef Piela;
1986–1990: Stanisław Rapa;
1990–1992: Andrzej Czapski;
1992–1997: Tadeusz Korszeń;
1997–1998: Marek Czarnecki.

Citations

Notes

References 

Former voivodeships of Poland (1975–1998)
Biała Podlaska
States and territories established in 1975
States and territories disestablished in 1998
1975 establishments in Poland
1998 disestablishments in Poland